Xerotricha conspurcata is a species of small air-breathing land snail, a terrestrial pulmonate gastropod mollusk in the family Geomitridae.

Description 
Xerotricha conspurcata grows up to 4.5 x 6.8 mm in size. It has a striated mottled brown shell marked with short hairs. This species makes and uses love darts as part of mating behavior.

Distribution

This snail is native to the Mediterranean region of Europe. It has been recorded in the United States in California and Washington as an introduced species.

References

Further reading 
 Calcara, P. (1842). Cenno topografico dei dintorni di Termini, 1-32. Palermo. (Roberti)
 Hausdorf, B. (1990). Über die Verbreitung von Microxeromagna armillata (Lowe, 1852) und Xerotricha conspurcata (Draparnaud, 1801) in Griechenland und der Türkei (Gastropoda, Pulmonata: Hygromiidae). Malakologische Abhandlungen Staatliches Museum für Tierkunde in Dresden, 15 (1, 6): 55-62. Dresden 
 Gittenberger, E. (1991). On Cyprian Helicellinae (Mollusca: Gastropoda Pulmonata: Helicidae), making a new start. Zoologische Mededelingen, 65 (7): 99-128. Leiden 
 Bank, R. A.; Neubert, E. (2017). Checklist of the land and freshwater Gastropoda of Europe. Last update: July 16th, 2017

External links
 Draparnaud, J. P. R. (1801). Tableau des mollusques terrestres et fluviatiles de la France. Montpellier / Paris (Renaud / Bossange, Masson & Besson). 1-116
 Benoit, C. L. (1857-1862). Illustrazione sistematica critica iconografica de'testacei estramarini della Sicilia ulteriore e delle isole circostanti. I-XVI, 1-248, Tav. I-IX, XI-XI
 Morelet, A. (1880). La faune malacologique du Maroc en 1880. Journal de Conchyliologie. 28(1): 1-83, pl. 3.
 Sparacio, I., Surdo, S., Viviano, R., Liberto, F. & Reitano, A. (2021). Land molluscs from the Isola delle Femmine Nature Reserve (north-western Sicily, Italy) (Gastropoda Architaenioglossa Pulmonata). Biodiversity Journal. 12 (3): 589–624

Geomitridae
Gastropods described in 1801